Heinz Schupp (born 26 February 1942) is an Austrian ice hockey player. He competed in the men's tournament at the 1968 Winter Olympics.

References

External links
 

1942 births
Living people
Austrian ice hockey players
Ice hockey players at the 1968 Winter Olympics
Olympic ice hockey players of Austria
Sportspeople from Klagenfurt